Polyommatus actinides is a butterfly of the family Lycaenidae. It was described by Otto Staudinger in 1886. It is found in central Asia.

The larvae feed on Onobrychis species.

Subspecies
Polyommatus actinides actinides (Zaalaisky Mountains)
Polyommatus actinides praeactinides (Forster, 1960) (western Tian-Shan)
Polyommatus actinides weidenhofferi Eckweiler, 1997 (Kirhgizsky Mountains)

References

Butterflies described in 1886
Polyommatus
Butterflies of Asia
Taxa named by Otto Staudinger